Dilhorn House is a two storey Federation Queen Anne-style building located on the corner of Bulwer and Lord streets, Perth, Western Australia.

Construction
The building was constructed for businessman William Thorley Loton. Loton was a wealthy merchant with large land holdings in the north-west of the state. He was a member of the Western Australian Legislative Council 1889–1890, 1898–1900, 1902–1908, the Mayor of Perth from 1901 to 1903, and knighted in 1923. The name Dilhorn is believed to be a reference to Loton's home town of Dilhorne, Staffordshire. It is a stately two storey brick and timber house, designed by Joseph John Talbot Hobbs and erected in 1897 at a cost of £4,684. It is situated on high ground looking over the Perth Oval to the city.

Loton also owned a large area of land opposite, known as Loton's Paddock, which he sold to the City of Perth in 1904, for the purpose of providing recreation for the residents of the area. In 1909, it was renamed Perth Oval and over time has been developed into a sporting stadium.

Loton died at Dilhorn House on 22 October 1924. After Lady Loton’s death in 1927, Dilhorn had various owners and was used as a boarding house.
 
In 1952 the Commonwealth Government purchased it for £13,000 for the headquarters for various army units and later the Army Museum of Western Australia. In 2001 it was sold to a private buyer.

Current use
, Dillhorn House is currently occupied by Aurora Environmental.

Heritage listing
Dilhorn was classified by the National Trust of Australia in 1982. The building was entered on the Register of the National Estate in 1986.

References

Landmarks in Perth, Western Australia
State Register of Heritage Places in the City of Vincent
Houses completed in 1897
Houses in Western Australia